Uwe Ebert (born 6 March 1945) is a retired German football goalkeeper.

References

1945 births
Living people
German footballers
SV Darmstadt 98 players
Association football goalkeepers
2. Bundesliga players
SV Darmstadt 98 managers
Sportspeople from Hildesheim
Footballers from Lower Saxony